In Islam, ‘Irfan,  literally ‘knowledge, awareness, wisdom’, is gnosis. Islamic mysticism can be considered as a vast range that engulfs theoretical and practical and conventional mysticism, but the concept of Irfan is emphasised mostly within the Shia sect of Islam.

Concept of Irfan in Sunni mysticism 
According to the founder of the Qadiriyya Tariqa, Sayyid Abdul Qadir Gilani Irfan is described as the acknowledgement of God's unity. This acknowledgement is achieved by studying under Islamic scholars. One method how these scholars can help in gaining acknowledgement about God's unity is by giving more inside in the internal meaning of the practice of Islamic rituals, like the Salah. The reflection upon the practice of Islam with the knowledge of respected islamic scholars (in concreto Awliya Allah) is described by the Sayyid as "nearness to God", manifested in acknowledgement of Allah (Irfan).

Avicenna also says in one of his books in definition of mystic as: the one that doesn't allow himself physical pleasures and overlooks this carnal world's pleasures is called "ascetic". The one that observes saying prayers and fasting, etc. is called "worshiper". The one that prevents his conscious from paying attention to the others but God and directed it to the transcendent world to be enlightened by God's light is known as "mystic". However, sometimes two or all these designations can be applied to a single person.

Shi'ite mysticism 
In comparison to Sunni mysticism which is generally known as Sufism, mysticism in Twelver Shiism is generally known as Irfan, which specifically literally translates to knowledge, but should not be confused with Greek gnosis and Gnosticism.

Ayatollah Al Sistani defines true Irfan as the practice of reciting prescribed duas taught by Twelve Imams, praying the Night Prayer, and seeking God's pleasure through Mustahab (recommended) actions. 

Among the most famous modern Shia proponents of Irfan were Usuli theologians Allāmah Tabatabai, Ruhollah Khomeini, Mohammad-Taqi Bāhjat, Allameh Hassan Hassanzadeh Amoli, and Allāmah Qādhi Tabatabai. However these scholars were heavily influenced by Ibn Arabi and can't be considered traditional Shia mystics. The 17th-century Mulla Sadra of Iran is generally seen as the historical ideologue for the gnostic form of irfan in Shi'ism which is considered as heretic and none Islamic by the traditionalist view, notably Najaf's seminary.

See also
Hikmah
Irfan (name)
Ma'rifa
Hikmat al-Muta’aliyah

References

External links
 "Sufism of Iran" - A Reference website for Sufi books
 Articles related to Irfan on Al-Islam.org

Islamic mysticism
Shia Islam
Islamic terminology